Munsey's Weekly, later known as Munsey's Magazine, was a 36-page quarto American magazine founded by Frank A. Munsey in 1889 and edited by John Kendrick Bangs. Frank Munsey aimed to publish "a magazine of the people and for the people, with pictures and art and good cheer and human interest throughout".  Soon after its inception, the magazine was selling 40,000 copies a week. In 1891, Munsey's Weekly adopted a monthly schedule and was renamed Munsey's Magazine.

In October 1893, Munsey reduced the price of the magazine from 25 cents to 10 cents, which was greatly successful. By 1895, the magazine had a circulation of 500,000 a month. It included numerous illustrations (including many by the illustrator Charles Howard Johnson) and was attacked for its "half-dressed women and undressed statuary". Some outlets refused to stock the magazine as a result, but circulation continued to grow and by 1897 had reached 700,000 per month.

Circulation began to fall in 1906 and by the 1920s was down to 60,000. In October 1929, Munsey's was merged with Argosy. It immediately thereafter demerged with Argosy All-Story to form All-Story, which continued on a monthly schedule under a variety of similar titles until May 1955.

Contributors 

Elisabeth Sanxay Holding's stories were published in Munsey's throughout 1920-1928.

Charles M. Relyea was among the illustrators whose work appeared in Munsey's.

Tod Robbins' short story "Spurs" was published by Munsey's in 1923. It was loosely adapted into the film Freaks (1932).

Mazo de la Roche, the author of the popular Jalna series, had her first story published in 1902 in Munsey's Magazine.

Robert William Service published the poem "Unforgotten" (also called "Apart and yet Together") in December 1903.

Eldred Kurtz Means's story "At the End of the Rope" contains the earliest known usage of the saying: If it wasn't for bad luck I wouldn't have any luck at all.

Editors 

 John Kendrick Bangs (January–June, 1889)
 Richard H. Titherington (Jul 1889 – ?)
 Robert H. Davis (fiction editor 1904–1905)
 Isaac Frederick Marcosson (1910–1913)
 William Marcus MacMahon, Editor-in-Chief (??? - ???)
 Richard H. Titherington (1921)
 Robert H. Davis (1922–1925)
 Richard H. Titherington (1925-1926)
 William Marcus MacMahon (1927-1929)

Front-cover Title Variations

Back issues
Full-text on-line versions available via Google Books (last accessed 2012-01-02):

 Vol VII: April 1892 to September 1892
 Vol VIII: October 1892 to March 1893
 Vol IX:  April 1893 to September 1893
 Vol X: October 1893 to March 1894
 Vol XI: April 1894 to September 1894
 Vol XII: October 1894 to March 1895
 Vol XIII: April 1895 to September 1895
 Vol XIV: October 1895 to March 1896
 Vol XV: April 1896 to September 1896
 Vol XVI: October 1896 to March 1897
 Vol XVII: April 1897 to September 1897
 Vol XVIII: October 1897 to March 1898
 Vol XIX: April 1898 to September 1898
 Vol XX: October 1898 to March 1899
 Vol XXI: April 1899 to September 1899
 Vol XXII: October 1899 to March 1900
 Vol XXIII: April 1900 to September 1900
 Vol XXIV: October 1900 to March 1901
 Vol XXV: April 1901 to September 1901
 Vol XXVI: October 1901 to March 1902
 Vol XXVII: April 1902 to September 1902
 Vol XXVIII: October 1902 to March 1903
 Vol XXIX: April 1903 to September 1903
 Vol XXX: October 1903 to March 1904
 Vol XXXI: April 1904 to September 1904
 Vol XXXII: October 1904 to March 1905
 Vol XXXIII: April 1905 to September 1905
 Vol XXXIV: October 1905 to March 1906
 Vol XXXV: April 1906 to September 1906
 Vol XXXVI: October 1906 to March 1907
 Vol XXXVII: April 1907 to September 1907
 Vol XXXVIII: October 1907 to March 1908
 Vol XXXIX April 1908 to September 1908
 Vol XL: October 1908 to March 1909
 Vol XLI: April 1909 to September 1909
 Vol XLII: October 1909 to March 1910
 Vol XLIII: April 1910 to September 1910
Vol XLIV: October 1910 to March 1911 (not found)
 Vol XLV: April 1911 to September 1911
 Vol XLVI: October 1911 to March 1912
 Vol XLVII: April 1912 to September 1912
Vol XLVIII: October 1912 to March 1913 (not found)
Vol XLIX: April 1913 to September 1913 (not found)
 Vol L: October 1913 to January 1914
 Vol LI: February 1914 to May 1914
 Vol LII: June 1914 to September 1914
 Vol LIII: October 1914 to January 1915
 Vol LVI: February 1915 to May 1915
 Vol LV: June 1915 to September 1915
 Vol LVI: October 1915 to January 1916
 Vol LVII: February 1916 to May 1916
 Vol LVIII: June 1916 to September 1916
 Vol LIX: October 1916 to January 1917
 Vol LX: February 1917 to May 1917
 Vol LXI: June 1917 to September 1917
 Vol LXII: October 1917 to January 1918
 Vol LXIII: February 1918 to May 1918
 Vol LXIV: June 1918 to September 1918
 Vol LXV: October 1918 to January 1919
 Vol LXVI: February 1919 to May 1919
 Vol LXVII: June 1919 to September 1919
 Vol LXVIII: October 1919 to January 1920
 Vol LXIX: February 1920 to May 1920
 Vol LXX: June 1920 to September 1920
 Vol LXXI: October 1920 to January 1921
 Vol LXXII: February 1921 to May 1921
 Vol LXXIII: June 1921 to September 1921
 Vol LXXIV: October 1921 to January 1922
 Vol LXXV: February 1922 to May 1922
 Vol LXXVI: June 1922 to September 1922

See also
 The Bookman
 Harper's Magazine
 McClure's
 The Outlook
 The Review of Reviews
 World's Work
 Pulp magazine

References

Sources
  Subtitles: Quarter of a Century Old : The Story of The Argosy, Our First Publication, and Incidentally the Story of Munsey's Magazine

Further reading

External links
 
 Munsey's Magazine at the HathiTrust

Defunct political magazines published in the United States
Monthly magazines published in the United States
Defunct literary magazines published in the United States
Magazines established in 1889
Magazines disestablished in 1929
Magazines published in New York City